

Eighth-final 1

Eighth-final 2

Eighth-final 3

Eighth-final 4

Eighth-final 5

Eighth-final 6

Eighth-final 7

Eighth-final 8

References

2002–03 ULEB Cup